Oncosperma platyphyllum is a species of flowering plant in the family Arecaceae. It is found only in the Philippines.

References

platyphyllum
Flora of the Philippines
Taxa named by Odoardo Beccari
Taxonomy articles created by Polbot

Critically endangered flora of Asia